A Tale of Two Cities is a British-French television series which first aired on ITV in 1989. It is an adaptation of the novel A Tale of Two Cities by Charles Dickens.

Plot summary

Selected cast
 James Wilby as Sydney Carton
 Xavier Deluc as Charles Darnay
 Serena Gordon as Lucie Manette
 John Mills as Jarvis Lorry
 Jean-Pierre Aumont as Dr. Alexandre Manette
 Anna Massey as Miss Pross
 Kathy Kriegel as Madame Defarge
 Alfred Lynch as Jerry Cruncher
 Gérard Klein as  Monsieur Defarge
 Jonathan Adams as Stryver
 Karl Johnson as Barsad
 Marie Bunel as  Peasant Girl
 Gilles Gaston-Dreyfus as Road Mender
 François Lalande as Gabelle
 Claude Le Saché as Aristocrat 
 André Maranne as Aristocrat 
 Nicolas Serreau as Jacques
 Jean-Pierre Stewart as Public Prosecutor 
 Michel Subor as Le père de Darnay
 Jean-Marc Bory as Marquis St. Evrémonde
 Mary Healey as  Mrs. Cruncher

References

Bibliography
 Ellen Baskin. Serials on British Television, 1950-1994. Scolar Press, 1996.

External links
 

ITV television dramas
1989 British television series debuts
1989 British television series endings
1980s British drama television series
Television series by ITV Studios
Television shows produced by Granada Television
English-language television shows
Television series set in the 18th century
Television shows based on works by Charles Dickens
Works based on A Tale of Two Cities